Chitti Babu can refer to:

Chitti Babu (Tamil actor) (1964–2013), Indian comedian, presenter and actor
Chitti Babu (Telugu actor), Indian film actor and comedian
Chitti Babu (character)
Chitti Babu (musician) (1936–1996), Carnatic music veena player and composer from South India
C. Chittibabu, Indian politician